Boneshaker was a Mondial Supernova flat-ride located at Alton Towers in Staffordshire, England. It was removed on 9 November 2003 due to mechanical failure in the ride's gearbox and inability to source required parts. The park also needed to source additional space to build a new roller coaster, Rita: Queen of Speed scheduled for completion in 2005 which also formed part of the decision. It first opened at the park in 1995 under the name "Energizer", but ran on less intense cycles in its later years to better suit Ug Land's intended family audience.

History

Energizer (1995-2000)
Energizer first opened on 18 March 1995 on the former 1001 Nights site in Festival Park area (known as UG Land from 1999-2009). The ride brought in many crowds of teenagers and thrill-seekers. Situated alongside the popular Corkscrew, the ride normally had quite long queue times.

When X-Sector opened in 1998, Energizer was re-located into the new area. Now situated next to Oblivion, the ride continued to see long queue times. At the end of 2000, Energizer was removed to make way for Submission, a Chance Double Inverter, that has also been removed from the park as of 2014.

Boneshaker (2001-2003)
At the end of the 2000 season, Energizer returned to its original location under the name Boneshaker at the back of the newly re-themed Festival Park, UG Land. Due to UG Land being a family themed area, the ride's program was modified to deliver a less intense and slower ride to fit the new location. Following these changes, the ride experienced many faults and became extremely costly for the park to maintain. The park decided to close the attraction at the end of the 2003 season, and at the end of 2004 it was removed to make way for Rita: Queen of Speed in 2005.

References

Amusement rides manufactured by Mondial
Amusement rides introduced in 1995
Amusement rides that closed in 2003
Alton Towers